The Out North Queer Film Festival is an annual LGBT film festival in Whitehorse, Yukon. Launched in 2012 by the Yukon Queer Film Alliance, the festival presents an annual program of LGBT films each fall.

The event is staged at the Yukon Beringia Interpretive Centre.

In addition to the main film festival, selected films are also screened at other times during the year in Whitehorse, as well as Dawson City, Faro and Haines Junction.

See also
 List of LGBT film festivals
 List of film festivals in Canada

References

External links

LGBT film festivals in Canada
Film festivals in Yukon
Culture of Whitehorse